Astro Box Office is a pay-per-view (PPV) system on the Astro platform in Brunei and Malaysia. It shows movies and occasionally sporting events.

History 
Astro Box Office launched in 2000 as Astro Showcase. At the time it carried mainly movies and it is free-to-air for some time. From then, a subscriber must pay RM 14.95 to view one movie. This could be achieved minutes before or even during the event either through a telephone or an on-screen menu and PIN system.

Season Pass was introduced in 2002, dedicated to showing sporting events.

On September 2003, Astro Showcase and Season Pass were re-branded as Astro Box Office Movies and Astro Box Office Sport.

Since 2007, it was re-categorized into Astro Box Office Movie Thangathirai and Astro Box Office Movie Tayangan Hebat. Movies Thangathirai is dedicated to Tamil films, while Movies Tayangan Hebat shows Asian and international films.

On 20 August 2014, Bollywood star Kajol launched Astro Box Office Movies for the first time in HD as Astro Box Office BollyOne HD for Bollywood fans. Astro's latest channel would be available for preview from 1 to 18 September.

On 2 August 2019, Astro Box Office Movie Tayangan Hebat and Astro Box Office Movies Thangathirai were upgraded to high definition (HD).

After 18 years of broadcasting, Astro Box Office Movies Tayangan Hebat ceased broadcasting and ceased transmission on June 1, 2021 at midnight stroke, but this channel shows will still be available On Demand.

Content 
At launch, it showed mainly movies from all around the Asian region and the world, but since the launch of Season Pass, movies along with sporting events have become the predominant content.

Films are currently first shown on Astro Box Office between two and four months after its theatrical release. Astro Box Office Movie Tayangan Hebat shows 8 movies for RM 10.55 monthly. Meanwhile, Astro Box Office Mobie Thangathirai is a channel that contains 4 Indian movies is priced at RM 6.95 monthly. Now for Astro Box Office BollyOne HD, its price is only for RM 5.00 per month.

Logos

External links 
Astro Box Office Movie Tayangan Hebat
 Astro Box Office Bollyone HD

Movie channels in Malaysia
Television channels and stations established in 2000
Box Office